Roman Josi (born 1 June 1990) is a Swiss professional ice hockey defenceman and captain of the Nashville Predators of the National Hockey League (NHL). Josi was drafted 38th overall by the Predators in the 2008 NHL Entry Draft.

During his NHL career, Josi set and broke numerous franchise records. In 2019–20, Josi became the first Swiss player and first player in Predators' franchise history to win the James Norris Memorial Trophy as the league's best defenceman. In 2021 he surpassed Mark Streit as the highest-scoring Swiss-born NHL player.

Early life
Roman Josi was born on 1 June 1990, in Bern, Switzerland as the second son to parents Doris and Peter Josi. He grew up in an athletic household as his mother is a former national team swimmer and his father played competitive soccer. Josi played both soccer and hockey as a youth before committing to ice hockey at the age of 10. Both his father and older brother are also involved in ice hockey; Yannic competed with HC Bern Altstadt in SwissDiv3 and Peter serves on the board of directors for SC Bern. He is a supporter of his hometown football club, BSC Young Boys.

Playing career

Early career
Growing up in Switzerland, Josi played with the local SC Bern from 2006 to 2010. He made his debut with the National League in the 2006–07 season but became a mainstay in the lineup during the 2007–08 season. In his first year of draft eligibility, Josi tallied eight points in 35 games while also representing Switzerland at two international tournaments. Leading up to the 2008 NHL Entry Draft, Josi was considered one of the top defencemen in the draft. He was eventually selected by the Nashville Predators in the second round, 38th overall. Following the draft, Josi returned to the Swiss league where he led all Swiss League junior players in points, goals, and assists. He was also one of just 17-year-olds to play in Switzerland's top division. Despite being sidelined for almost four weeks during the 2009–10 season, Josi accumulated 20 points through 24 games by the end of December 2009. He eventually finished the season ranked second among Swiss blueliners in points per game despite being limited to only 26 contests. During the 2010 NLA playoffs, Josi led all defensemen and tied for fourth overall in goals as SC Bern won the Championship title.

Nashville Predators
 
Josi joined the Predators' organization for the 2010–11 season after he signed a three-year entry-level contract on 28 May 2010. He participated in their Rookie and Training Camp before being assigned to their American Hockey League (AHL) affiliate, the Milwaukee Admirals, for the remainder of the season. Although he missed the first seven games of the season, Josi helped the team improve to a 5–0–0–1 record by scoring his first career AHL goal in a 3–2 win over the Lake Erie Monsters in early November. He recorded 14 points in his first 35 AHL games before breaking out and maintaining a 13-game scoring streak from 20 January to 20 February. His point streak was the longest by an Admiral player since Mike Santorelli maintained a 14-game streak in 2008. By 26 February, Josi had collected 12 points in 11 games during the month of February and ranked among the top-15 in AHL rookie scoring. Josi was subsequently a nominee for the Reebok/AHL Rookie of the Month for February, which he lost to Brandon Kozun. As the Admirals qualified for the 2011 Calder Cup playoffs, Josi finished the regular season with six goals and 34 assists for 30 points through 69 games. During the Admirals West Division semifinal matchup against the Texas Stars, Josi recorded an assist in each of his first four postseason games.

Josi once again participated in the Predators training camp before being placed on injured reserve with the expectation he would report to the Admirals once recovered for the 2011–12 season. Once healthy, Josi tallied four points in his first five games before being recalled to the NHL level on 25 November. He subsequently played 12:20 minutes of ice time in his debut the following day against the Detroit Red Wings. He later scored his first career NHL goal on 10 December to lift the team 3–2 over the Anaheim Ducks. Josi played 12:45 minutes of ice time during the game, including time on the power play, and recorded one blocked shot and one hit. After defenseman Shea Weber suffered an injury, Josi saw his ice time spike to an average of 23:43 for four games during his absence. Once Weber returned, Josi and fellow rookie defenseman Ryan Ellis were put on the second power-play unit and Josi saw his ice time average out to 20 minutes per game. While playing alongside new teammate Hal Gill, Josi began to play more offensively and began tallying points. He maintained a three-game point streak in February after going pointless for 14 games. Within Gill's first nine games with the team, Josi produced two goals, five points, and +7 plus/minus rating. The two were praised by teammate Ryan Suter who said: "We’re [the forwards] not playing as much as we did before we got Hal (Gill). All of our defensemen are really stepping up right now." This was shortlived, however, as Josi missed nine games with an upper-body injury. In his return on 30 March, he played an important role for Nashville's first three goals scored and he recorded a team-high 4 shots on goal. Josi helped the Predators finish the regular season with a 4–1–0 record as they qualified for the 2012 Stanley Cup playoffs.

Following his rookie season, Josi returned to his youth team, SC Bern, because of the NHL lockout. He played alongside NHL stars John Tavares and Mark Streit. When the lockout was resolved in January 2013, Josi returned to the Predators for training camp. He quickly improved on his rookie seasons point totals and set new career-highs in goals, assists, points, and games played. After the Predators lost Ryan Suter, Josi stepped into a bigger role on the ice alongside Shea Weber. While playing alongside Weber, Josi tallied four goals and 10 assists for 14 points through 31 games. He eventually finished the season with five goals and 13 assists through 41 games. On 10 June 2013, Josi signed a seven-year, $28 million contract to remain with the Predators through 2019–20.

In the first year of his new contract, Josi continued to improve and had another career-best season. He completely replaced Suter on the Predators top defencemen pairing with Weber and averaged nearly 26:30 of ice time per game. Despite his success, Josi began the season with a concussion after playing in two games. He subsequently missed 10 games to recover. Upon returning, he had a minus rating in five of his first six games before he slowly began improving. By early December, Josi had accumulated 30 blocked shots through 18 games. Later that month, he also tied his career high five-game point streak. By 14 January, Josi had tallied four goals and 10 assists and ranked sixth in the NHL in minutes played. During a game later that month against the Calgary Flames, he became the second defenseman in franchise history to tally two shootout goals in a season. Upon returning from the Olympics, Josi continued to produce and tied with Patric Hörnqvist for second on the team with 21 assists by mid-March. Josi finished the season with 13 goals and 40 points. through 72 games.

While playing alongside Weber during the 2014–15 season, Josi scored 15 goals and 55 points, one shy of the Predators’ single-season scoring record for defensemen set by Weber in 2013-14. While playing on the Predators top defensive pair with Weber, Josi ranked fifth in the League in average time on ice per game through the first 11 games. Later, in November, Josi helped the Predators tie their franchise record for most goals in a single game. He tallied a goal in the third period to lift the Predators to a 9–2 win over the Toronto Maple Leafs. By 16 December, Josi ranked second on the team with 15 points while leading team defenseman in assists. He also led the team in blocked shots and ranked fifth in the League in average time on ice. Through the first two weeks of January, Josi tallied three game-winning goals in a row and also recorded his 100th and 101 career points. By the end of January, Josi and Weber ranked among the League's Top 15 defensemen in points. He had accumulated nine goals and 24 assists for 33 points while Weber had 34 points. Josi also ranked fifth amongst all NHL skaters in time on ice with 26:22. By March, Josi and Weber combined for 89 points, the most of any defensive duo in the NHL. His play helped the Predators qualify for the 2015 Stanley Cup playoffs after the team failed to qualify during the previous two seasons. Josi finished the 2014–15 regular season with 15 goals and 40 assists for 55 points. He also recorded 209 blocked shots, the second most of any NHL player in the 2014–15 season. During the Predators first-round matchup against the Chicago Blackhawks, Josi set and tied numerous franchise records. In Game 4, he played a franchise-record 45:06 minutes of ice time in their triple-overtime loss and tied the franchise record for most playoff shots by a blueliner in one game with seven. At the end of the season, Josi finished in the top five for the Norris Trophy vote.

Prior to the start of the 2015–16 season, Josi was named the third alternate captain for the Predators alongside Mike Fisher and James Neal. The Predators began the season strong, going 3–0–0 in their first three games. In their third game of the season, Josi tallied his first and second goals of the season and set a new franchise record. His second goal was an empty-net, shorthanded, game-winning goal, marking the first time in franchise history that a player scored that trifecta in one goal, and the first time in the NHL since Brian Boyle on March 7, 2015. He later recorded his 100th career NHL assist during the Predators 3–2 win over Ducks on 17 November. His overall play earned him his first-time selection for the 2016 NHL All-Star Game along with teammates Pekka Rinne, Shea Weber, and James Neal. During the tournament portion, Josi participated in the Fastest Skater competition and finished with a time of 13.527 seconds. By the end of January, Josi led the Predators defensemen with 10 goals and 25 assists for 35 points. Following the NHL All-Star break, the Predators maintained a 14-game point streak from 9 February to 12 March. During that stretch, Josi accumulated one goal and 11 assists. At the end of the month, during a loss to the Colorado Avalanche, Josi set a new franchise record for most points by a defenseman in Predators history. At the time of the record, he had accumulated 13 goals and 44 assists for 57 points, one more than Weber's record-setting 56. He would eventually finish the regular season with 14 goals and 47 assists for a franchise-record 61 points through 81 games.

The Predators would eventually qualify for the 2016 Stanley Cup playoffs where they faced the Anaheim Ducks in the first round. Josi tallied three points as the Predators eliminated the Ducks in the first Game 7 of their franchise history to advance to the Western Conference Second Round against the San Jose Sharks. After the Predators were eliminated by the Sharks, Josi revealed he had been playing through a broken finger and a broken nose. He had sustained the injury to his finger before the playoffs began but he injured his nose during the playoffs. Despite these injuries, Josi finished the playoffs with one goal and eight assists for nine points through 14 games. Josi finished in the top five again for the Norris Trophy vote and was named to the NHL All-Star team.

During the 2016 offseason, the Predators acquired defencemen P. K. Subban from the Montreal Canadiens in exchange for Weber. Suban was expected to replace Weber as Josi's full-time defensive partner. Although they only played one preseason game together, the two were paired together for the Predators season opener. Prior to the start of the 2016–17 season, Josi was selected as a full-time alternate captain along with James Neal. The Predators began the season on a slow start as Josi and Subban began developing chemistry together. The two were paired together for the first four games of the season before moving onto new partners. In these new pairings, the Predators maintained a six-game point streak while both Josi and Subban accumulated eight points apiece through 14 games. Josi recorded five goals and 17 assists through 42 games before being placed on injured reserve on 13 January 2017. He returned to full form in February as he paced all NHL defenseman with 16 points in the month. From 15 March to 8 April, Josi tallied one goal and six assists. He also skated in his 400th career NHL game with the Predators on 27 March as the Predators maintained their 39–25–11 record. He finished the 2016–17 regular season with 12 goals and 37 assists for 49 points as the Predators faced the Chicago Blackhawks in the first round of the 2017 Stanley Cup playoffs. Josi's defensive skill played a crucial role in the Predators 2017 Stanley Cup playoffs run. His six goals set a franchise record for most goals by a defenseman in a single postseason. Josi finished the postseason with six goals and 14 points in 22 games to rank second among all Nashville skaters.

Prior to the start of the 2017–18 season, Josi was named the seventh captain in Predators history on 19 September 2017. In his first year as captain, Josi settled with Mattias Ekholm as his main defensive partner for the first half of the season. Josi and Ekholm were the Predators first defensive pair while Subban and Alexei Emelin comprised the second. Josi missed the first three games of the season due to a lower-body injury but he made an immediate impact with two points in his return on 17 October. Josi later helped the Predators tie a franchise record by scoring a power-play goal in their 11th consecutive home game. Although the streak ended at 11 games, the Predators ended November with a 10–3–1 record to tie for the second-most wins in a single month in franchise history. Once Ryan Ellis returned from injury in January, he was reunited with Josi as the Predators top defence pairing while Ekholm joined Subban. Following his return, the Predators quickly picked up another points streak and subsequently earned a point in eight straight games from 2 January to 31 January. On 20 February, Josi recorded his 200th career assist to place fifth on the franchise's all time list. Later that month, he also tied the franchise record for most assists and points in a single game with five against the Winnipeg Jets. As the Predators made a push for the 2018 Stanley Cup playoffs, Josi, Craig Smith, Scott Hartnell, and Yannick Weber were made healthy scratches for maintenance purposes. It was later revealed that Josi was scratched because he had suffered an upper-body injury. He subsequently missed four games to recover before returning on 11 March to help the team continue their 10-game point streak. A few games later, the Predators hit 100 points in a season for the sixth time in franchise history. On 5 April, Josi and the Predators clinched their first Central Division title in franchise history and won the Presidents' Trophy as the team with the most points during the NHL regular season. Josi finished the 2017–18 regular season with 14 goals and 39 assists for 53 points to rank second among Predators defensemen behind Subban. The two defensemen also finished in the top seven in Norris Trophy voting. Josi also had an NHL career-high plus-24 rating and led the Predators in shots on goal, blocked shots, and average ice time per game. Despite his regular-season success, Josi was held without a goal through 13 playoff games as the Predators fell to the Winnipeg Jets in Game 7 of the second round.

Prior to the start of the 2018–19 season, Josi was ranked among the top 10 NHL Defensemen by NHL Network's hockey pundits. He began the season strong, maintaining a five-game point streak through 12 November. While the Predators began suffering injuries in December, Josi ranked second on the team with five goals and 18 assists for 23 points. By January, Josi had tallied 18 points through 23 games and ranked second on the team and first among team defensemen in points with 29. He was subsequently named to his second NHL All-Star Game alongside Pekka Rinne. Leading up to the All-Star Game, Josi ranked 10th in the NHL among defensemen with 36 points and third in assists per 60 at 1.28, behind Tyson Barrie. Josi continued to rank second behind centre Ryan Johansen on the Predators through February with 14 goals and 37 assists for 51 points through 67 games. The Predators won the Central Division for the second consecutive season and faced off against the Dallas Stars in the Western Conference First Round of the 2019 Stanley Cup playoffs. Josi tallied two goals and two assists for four points through six games as the Stars eliminated the Predators.

Josi signed an eight-year, $72.472 million contract extension with the Predators during the 2019–20 season. The lengthy contract also came with a no-movement clause. Josi spent most of the 2019–20 season playing alongside Ryan Ellis and the two were consistently ranked among the best defensive duo in the league. The duo began the season on a productive note, becoming the first defensemen teammates to each post 13 points within a first 11 games since 1992-93. Josi was named the NHL's Second Star of the Week for the week ending on 27 October after he recorded six points through three games. The Predators began struggling in November and they accumulated a 1–6–1 record through eight games in the month. During their eighth loss, a 7–2 blowout by the Chicago Blackhawks on 16 November, Josi tallied his 100th career NHL goal. Despite his teams' struggles, Josi was an early favourite to win the James Norris Memorial Trophy as the league's best defenceman. The Predators improved their record in December as Josi set a career-high four game goal streak and recorded his fourth multi-goal games this season, the most among NHL defensemen. His efforts were later recognized by the NHL with his second Second Star of the Week honor for the week ending on 22 December. Josi extended his goal streak to five games before it was snapped in a loss to the Pittsburgh Penguins on 27 December. By the end of December, Josi had maintained a career-high seven-game point streak and tallied a defencemen leading 14 goals and 39 assists. As such, he was named to the 2020 NHL All-Star Game, his third career All-Star Game. During the Predators 2020 NHL Winter Classic, Josi extend his career-high point streak to eight games and became the first defenseman in franchise history to reach the 40-point mark in fewer than 40 games. After tallying two points the following game, Josi set a new franchise record for points by a player through the first 40 games of the season. He then set another record on 5 January for longest point streak by a defenseman in Predators history, surpassing Shea Weber.

Although Josi was experiencing success, the Predators were struggling to win games and had fallen to 11th in the conference standings by 7 January. As such, the team fired their head coach Peter Laviolette and replaced him with former New Jersey Devils coach John Hynes. Under the new coach, Josi extended his point streak to 12 games, during which he accumulated seven goals and 13 assists for 20 points. By the end of January, Josi became the second NHL defenseman to reach the 50-point mark as he had accumulated 14 goals and 37 assists for 51 points. During a game against the Dallas Stars on 7 March, Josi was assessed a minor penalty for high-sticking Corey Perry and later fined $5,000 by the NHL's Department of Player Safety. Before the NHL paused play due to the COVID-19 pandemic, Josi recorded his 48th assist of the season to set a new career high. At the time of the pause, Josi was second in scoring among defensemen with 16 goals and 49 assists for 65 points through 69 games. He was also second among defensemen in even-strength points and fifth in power-play points. Josi also became the eighth defenseman in NHL history to lead a team in scoring at the end of a season with at least 15 points over the next-closest skater. Once the NHL resumed play, Josi and the Predators faced off against the Arizona Coyotes in the 2020 Stanley Cup Qualifiers. Although the season was shortened due to the COVID-19 pandemic, Josi set new career highs in goals, assists, and points and became the first Predators player and Swiss to win the James Norris Memorial Trophy. 

Following his Norris Trophy win, Predators head coach John Hynes announced his plans to cut down on Josi's penalty-killing minutes in order to conserve his energy. Josi and defensive partner Ellis were also recognized on the NHL Network's list of the Top 20 Defensemen in the League. Once the shortened 2020–21 season began, the Predators had to postpone their first two games due to an outbreak of the coronavirus. Besides these delays, Josi also began the season on a slow start by tallying one goal and one assist through his first six games. He slowly began accumulating points and added one goal and five assists for eight total points by 20 February. He continued to produce before suffering an upper body injury in early March. At the time of the injury, Josi ranked second on the team with two foals and 14 assists for 16 points through 25 games. Josi missed seven games to recover before returning for the Predators 2–0 win against the Detroit Red Wings on 23 March. Following a 3–0 shutout of the Blackhawks on 3 April, Josi passed Mark Streit to became the highest scoring Swiss-born NHL player with 435 points. Josi finished the regular season with a team-leading eight goals and 25 assists for 33 points. Josi tallied four points during the Predators first round matchup against the Carolina Hurricanes in the first round of the 2021 Stanley Cup playoffs.

After a disappointing 2020–21 season, Josi bounced back in 2021–22 and set numerous personal and franchise records. His record-setting began early in the season after he tallied four points in a game against the Arizona Coyotes on 13 November. This marked the first time in his career that Josi had tallied two four-point games in a season. Later that month, he tallied two assists in his 700th NHL game as the Predators defeated the New Jersey Devils 4–2. Josi became the fourth player in franchise history to hit the 700 games played mark, behind David Legwand, Shea Weber, and Martin Erat. By the quarter-point mark of the regular season, Josi ranked fifth in points among all league defensemen and third in goals through 23 games. As such, he was considered an early candidate for the Norris Trophy alongside Adam Fox and Aaron Ekblad. Josi had an extremely productive month of January where he set numerous franchise and personal records. Early into the month, he passed Martin Erat for the second-most points in Predators history with his 483th career points. Later, he also broke his previous record for fewest games by a defenseman to reach 40 points by tallying his 40th point in 38 games. On 20 January, Josi tallied his 357th assist to move into sole possession of the Predators franchise record for assists by a single player. After tallying another assist in the 5–2 win over the Winnipeg Jets, Josi also became the eighth active defensemen to record his 114th career multi-point game. At the conclusion of the month, Josi led the team and ranked fourth among all NHL defensemen in points with 43. As a result of his accomplishments, Josi was named to his third career NHL All-Star Game.

Upon returning from the NHL All-Star Game, Josi continued his record-breaking season. On 19 March, Josi became the second defenseman in NHL history to score at least three points in four straight games. His numerous multi-point games helped him lead all defencemen with 17 goals and 58 assists through 60 games on pace for a 100-point season. As a result of his accomplishments, Josi earned his first NHL First Star of the Week honor for the week ending March 20. Josi later earned his first NHL First Star of the Month honor as he finished the month of March with 24 assists and 28 points through 14 games. He thus became the first defencemen to earn this honor since John Carlson in October 2019. Josi continued his momentum into April where he continued to set franchise records. On April 7, 2022, Josi recorded three assists while scoring his 87th point, breaking Paul Kariya's previous record to become the Predators single-season points leader. During the game, he also tallied three points for the 12th night of the season, tying him with Paul Coffey for the most in a single season. His outstanding season continued as later that month, he also became the first defenseman since 1994 to record 90 points in a single campaign. Josi helped the Predators clinch a playoff berth in the 2022 Stanley Cup playoffs but they again failed to get passed the first round. In recognition of his achievements, Josi was again a finalist for the Norris Trophy and was for the first time a finalist for the Ted Lindsay Award, awarded by the NHL Players' Association to the league's most outstanding player. He finished second in Norris voting, albeit with the most first place votes, and also was sixth in voting for the Hart Memorial Trophy.

In March 2023, Josi became the second-fastest active defenseman to reach 600 points in his NHL career. While he reached this milestone in his 823rd game, Josi also set a new franchise record for most 40-assist seasons. Josi subsequently became the second defenseman to lead an active NHL franchise in points, joining Ray Bourque.

International play

As a native of Switzerland, Josi has represented his home country at both the junior and senior levels in international tournaments. He made his international debut at the age of 16 during the 2007 World Junior Ice Hockey Championships. Josi also later participated at the 2007 IIHF World U18 Championships for Team Switzerland junior team. He was again named to Team Swiss at the 2008 World Junior Ice Hockey Championships and 2008 IIHF World U18 Championships. During the 2009 World Junior Ice Hockey Championships, Josi tallied three goals and five points to lead Switzerland to a 5–0 record and promotion into the top division for next year’s World Junior Championships. For his performance, Josi was named the Best Defenseman of the Tournament. Later, during the 2009 IIHF World Championship, Josi tallied no points through six games as the team failed to medal. The following year, Josi joined the Swiss national junior team for their first year in the IIHF World Junior Championship D1. In his final junior tournament, Josi tallied one goal and two assists for three points through four games.

After concluding his junior championship tournament, Josi was selected to play for Switzerland at the 2010 Winter Olympics. However, he was unable to make his Olympics debut due to a broken finger he suffered at the World Junior Championships. He eventually made his senior debut for Switzerland at the 2010 IIHF World Championship and immediately made an impression on the team. Josi opened the tournament by tallying the game-winning goal for Switzerland in its 3-1 win over Latvia. He also recorded a power-play assist on Switzerland's second goal of an eventual 3–0 shutout over Italy. His three points through three games tied him for the most among tournament defensemen through the Preliminary Round. Josi again represented the Swedish national team at the 2012 and 2013 IIHF World Championship. On 19 May 2013, Josi helped Switzerland reach the final of any IIHF World Championship] for only the second time. He finished the tournament with four goals and five assists to earn tournament MVP and become the first Swiss player to be honoured with selection for the World Championships ‘All-star Team’. Josi eventually made his Olympics debut during the 2014 Winter Olympics. He went pointless through four games as the Swiss failed to medal. 

In 2016, Josi was selected to play for Team Europe in his first World Cup of Hockey. He later won his third silver medal with Switzerland at the 2018 IIHF World Championship after the team fell to Sweden in the shootout. He was not as successful during the 2019 IIHF World Championship as Switzerland failed to medal.

Personal life 
Josi married Ellie Ottaway, a model and musician, on 20 June 2019. They had their first child in February 2021.

While the NHL paused play due to the COVID-19 pandemic, Josi became active in support efforts across Tennessee. He helped raise funds to support the Nashville Strong tornado relief efforts and donated $20,000 to the Second Harvest Food Bank of Middle Tennessee. He also donated another $20,000 to Home Street Home Ministrieshere in Nashville.

Career statistics

Regular season and playoffs

All statistics taken from NHL.com

International

Awards and achievements

Records

Nashville Predators
 Most Assists (402)
 Most Assists in a season (73, 2021–22)
 Most Points in a season (96, 2021–22)

References

External links

 

1990 births
Ice hockey players at the 2014 Winter Olympics
Living people
Milwaukee Admirals players
Nashville Predators draft picks
Nashville Predators players
James Norris Memorial Trophy winners
Neuchâtel Young Sprinters HC players
Olympic ice hockey players of Switzerland
SC Bern players
Ice hockey people from Bern
Swiss ice hockey defencemen
National Hockey League All-Stars
Swiss expatriate sportspeople in the United States
Expatriate ice hockey players in the United States
Swiss expatriate ice hockey people